Chamber of Commerce Building, or variations, may refer to:
 Chamber of Commerce Building (Berkeley, California), a National Register of Historic Places listing in Alameda County, California
 Chamber of Commerce Building (Denver, Colorado), a National Register of Historic Places listing in downtown Denver
 Chamber of Commerce Building (Steamboat Springs, Colorado)
 Lake Mary Chamber of Commerce Building, Lake Mary, Florida
 Chamber of Commerce Building (Terre Haute, Indiana)
 Chamber of Commerce Building (Baltimore, Maryland)
 Minneapolis Grain Exchange or Chamber of Commerce Building, Minneapolis, Minnesota
 Billings Chamber of Commerce Building, a National Register of Historic Places listing in Yellowstone County, Montana
 Jamaica Chamber of Commerce Building, New York, New York
 Chamber of Commerce Building (New York, New York)
 Chamber of Commerce (Rochester, New York)
 Chamber of Commerce Building (Greenville, South Carolina)
 US Chamber of Commerce Building, in Washington, DC
 Gould House/Greater Parkersburg Chamber of Commerce, Parkersburg, West Virginia

See also
Commerce Building (disambiguation)